Aegialites is a genus of narrow-waisted bark beetles in the family Salpingidae. There are about 13 described species in Aegialites.

Species
These 13 species belong to the genus Aegialites.

References

Further reading

 
 
 
 

Salpingidae